Lennard "Len" Väljas (born 21 November 1988) is a Canadian former cross-country skier. He was born in Toronto, and is of Estonian descent. He is the younger brother of Canadian beach volleyball Olympian Kristina May.

Väljas competed at the sprint event at the World Ski Championships 2011 in Oslo where he placed 15th.

Väljas achieved his first podium finish on the World Cup on March 7, 2012, in a Sprint Classic races in Drammen, Norway.

He announced his retirement from cross-country skiing in March 2019.

Cross-country skiing results
All results are sourced from the International Ski Federation (FIS).

Olympic Games

World Championships

World Cup

Season standings

Individual podiums

 5 podiums – (1 , 4 )

Team podiums
 1 victory – (1 ) 
 2 podiums – (1 , 1 )

References

External links 

 
 
 
 
 

1988 births
Living people
Canadian male cross-country skiers
Tour de Ski skiers
Canadian people of Estonian descent
Skiers from Toronto
Cross-country skiers at the 2014 Winter Olympics
Cross-country skiers at the 2018 Winter Olympics
Olympic cross-country skiers of Canada